Mursia is a genus of crabs in the family Calappidae, containing the following species:

 Mursia africana Galil, 1993
 Mursia armata De Haan, 1837
 Mursia aspera Alcock, 1899
 Mursia aurorae Galil & Ng, 2009
 Mursia australiensis Campbell, 1971
 Mursia baconaua Galil & Takeda, 2004
 Mursia balguerii Desbonne in Desbonne & Schramm, 1867
 Mursia bicristimana Alcock & Anderson, 1895
 Mursia buwaya Galil & Takeda, 2004
 Mursia coseli Crosnier, 1997
 Mursia cristiata H. Milne-Edwards, 1837
 Mursia cristimanus De Haan, 1837
 Mursia curtispina Miers, 1886
 Mursia danigoi Galil, 1993
 Mursia diwata Galil & Takeda, 2004
 Mursia flamma Galil, 1993
 Mursia hawaiiensis Rathbun, 1894
 Mursia longispina Crosnier, 1997
 Mursia mameleu Galil & Takeda, 2004
 Mursia mcdowelli Manning & Chace, 1990
 Mursia microspina Davie & Short, 1989
 Mursia minuta Spiridonov & Apel, 2007
 Mursia musorstomia Galil, 1993
 Mursia orientalia Galil & Takeda, 2005
 Mursia poupini Galil, 2001
 Mursia spinimanus Rathbun, 1906
 Mursia steinhardti Galil & Ng, 2009
 Mursia trispinosa Parisi, 1914
 Mursia xianshengi Lai & Galil, 2006
 Mursia zarenkovi Galil & Spiridonov, 1998

References

Calappoidea
Decapod genera